is a  third-person shooter action role-playing video game developed by Dimps for the PlayStation 4, Xbox One, Nintendo Switch and Microsoft Windows based on the Sword Art Online light novel series. It is the fifth game in the series and is the successor to the 2016 game Sword Art Online: Hollow Realization. The PlayStation 4 version was released in Japan on February 8, 2018, with a worldwide release on PlayStation 4, Xbox One, and Microsoft Windows on February 23. The Nintendo Switch version was release as a Complete Edition, including all DLC, on August 8 in Japan and August 9 worldwide.

Taking place in the virtual reality MMORPG (VRMMORPG) Gun Gale Online, Fatal Bullet features an alternate timeline to the light novels and anime.

Gameplay
Unlike past installments, Fatal Bullet features original character creation and the usage of firearms in battle, though other weapons like Kirito's photon sword are also available. As the player progresses through the story, they can also unlock the ability to dual-wield a gun and photon sword in a similar manner to Kirito. A third-person shooter and role-playing game hybrid, players can level up and gain skills as the game progresses. While fighting, players are provided with a wire that can allow them to quickly move around; although the wire is not in the canonical Gun Gale Online, a Bullet Line system – which serves as an assist in defending the user – is included in Fatal Bullet.

The game features multiplayer, which allows players to form four-man cooperative parties or fight against one another in four-on-four player versus player (PvP) matches. In PvP deathmatches, players are split into Alpha and Bravo teams, fighting each other in addition to computer-controlled enemies.

As in previous installments, the player can engage in conversations with other characters; as Kirito, one can do so with those in the canon, while the protagonist avatar has such dialogues with characters from the game universe.

Synopsis
Fatal Bullet takes place in Gun Gale Online, a VRMMORPG that was introduced in the second season of the anime. Following the events of Sword Art Online: Hollow Realization, GGO was released by Zaskar following the advent of The Seed.

The player creates their own character, who joins GGO alongside their friend Kureha. During the story, the pair meet ArFA-sys, a humanoid AI, along with the rest of the main cast. In contrast with the light novels and anime, characters like Asuna and Leafa are present in GGO. Other new characters introduced in the game include Basalt Joe, a powerful player who frequently challenges the protagonist to claim ArFA-sys, Zeliska, a strong yet friendly player who also has an ArFA-sys, and Itsuki, a strategist and sniper with a preference for using traps like land mines.

The final chapter of the main campaign also offers a branching ending based on player choice and provides a third ending, called "True Ending" as the canon ending.

Series author Reki Kawahara supervised development of the game's story. As the game progresses, the player can switch to Kirito Mode, which allows them to play a different storyline.

Development
Bandai Namco Entertainment Trademark "Fatal Bullet" on July 12, 2017. On August 14, 2017, a teaser called "Project 1514" shown a ruined city in futuristic base. The game was finally revealed on August 18, 2017. It was developed by Dimps, Fatal Bullet runs on Unreal Engine 4; a Siliconera writer described the gameplay as bearing some similarity to Freedom Wars, another game produced by Dimps.

Fatal Bullet is the first in the SAO series to be available on Xbox One and PC, the latter being downloadable through Steam.

Reception

Sword Art Online: Fatal Bullet received "mixed or average" reviews, according to video game review aggregator Metacritic. IGN had a mixed rating, saying: "...the poor story pacing and the repetitive nature of exploration dragged it down. While it's a good change of pace for games based on SAO, it still lacks the polish needed to really stand out." Rating the PlayStation 4 version a 7/10, indicating "Good", Josh Tolentino from Destructoid said it was: "Solid and definitely has an audience. There could be some hard-to-ignore faults, but the experience is fun."

Sales  
In Japan, approximately 11,770 physical units for Switch were sold during its launch week becoming the number five selling game of any format. Steam Spy estimates that the game sold at least 500,000 digital units on Steam.

References

External links
 

2018 video games
Action role-playing video games
Bandai Namco games
Dimps games
Multiplayer and single-player video games
Nintendo Switch games
PlayStation 4 games
Science fiction video games
Fatal Bullet
Unreal Engine games
Video games developed in Japan
Video games featuring protagonists of selectable gender
Windows games
Xbox One games